Hamelia patens is a large perennial shrub or small tree in the family	Rubiaceae, that is native to the American subtropics and tropics. Its range extends from Florida in the southern United States to as far south as Argentina. Common names include firebush, hummingbird bush, scarlet bush, and redhead.  In Belize, this plant's Mayan name is Ix Canaan and is also known as "Guardian of the Forest".

Growth

Firebush has orangish-red tubular flowers, which recruit hummingbirds and butterflies for pollination. The corollas vary greatly in length, making them attractive to a wide range of pollinators. The fruit is a small dark red berry, turning black at maturity.

Despite its somewhat scraggy appearance, this is a valuable garden tree in warmer climates and even in temperate ones, as long as the soil remains above freezing.

Uses
Hummingbirds are attracted by its flowers and other birds feed on the fruit, both of which will also forage on small insects found in the vicinity, helping to keep down pests. These flowers are also fed on by butterflies, such as the statira sulphur (Aphrissa statira), which are attracted to red flowering plants. The fruits have a refreshing, acidic taste and are also edible by humans; in Mexico, they are made into a fermented drink.

Folk medicine
The plants are used in folk medicine for a range of ailments.

Chemical constituents
A number of active compounds have been found in firebush, including maruquine, isomaruquine, pteropodine, isopteropodine, palmirine, rumberine, seneciophylline and stigmast-4-ene-3,6-dione. The bark contains significant amounts of tannins.

Gallery

References

External links

patens
Flora of the Caribbean
Flora of Florida
Flora of Mexico
Flora of Central America
Flora of South America
Medicinal plants of Central America
Medicinal plants of North America
Medicinal plants of South America
Plants described in 1763
Butterfly food plants
Garden plants of North America
Garden plants of South America
Taxa named by Nikolaus Joseph von Jacquin
Flora without expected TNC conservation status